Bailey Park may refer to:

Bailey Park in Austin, Texas
Bailey Park (Winston-Salem) in Winston-Salem, North Carolina
Bailey Park (Tullycraft song)
Bailey Park, Abergavenny